Swords & Sorcerers is a 1978 role-playing game supplement published by Fantasy Games Unlimited for Chivalry & Sorcery.

Contents
Swords & Sorcerers presents historical data, mythological concepts, and game mechanics for Vikings, Mongols, and Celts.

Reception
Ronald Pehr reviewed Swords & Sorcerers in The Space Gamer No. 45. Pehr commented that "Anyone who plays Chivalry & Sorcery, or anyone who just wants to see what fantasy role-playing is all about, wants to buy Swords & Sorcerers."

Paul Cockburn reviewed Swords & Sorcerers for Imagine magazine, and stated that "With this book, useful information is presented in such a way that the GM quickly introduce elements of these societies into the campaign. C&S is rightly praised as a game that encourages role-playing, as opposed to 'adventuring' (as Daredevils) or random combat (as Merc), and this manual will provide considerable extra enjoyment to its adherents."

References

Chivalry & Sorcery
Fantasy role-playing game supplements
Role-playing game supplements introduced in 1978